Grieve is a Peruvian automobile built by Juan Alberto Grieve in 1908.

Grieve or Grieves may also refer to:

 Grieve, to experience grief
 Grieve (in Scotland), a manager or steward
 Grieve (surname)
 4451 Grieve, a Mars-crossing asteroid
 Grieves (born 1984), Seattle-base rapper

See also
 Greave, a piece of armour that protects the leg
 Greaves (disambiguation)
 Grieves (disambiguation)